Álvaro Quezada (born March 4, 1999) is an American professional soccer player.

Career

Youth 
Quezada played four seasons with LA Premier FC, now known as Los Angeles Surf Soccer Club, prior to attending college.

College 
In 2017, Quezada attended University of California, Irvine to play college soccer. Over three seasons, Quezada made 55 appearances, scoring 8 goals and tallying 9 assists for the Anteaters. There was no 2020 season in the Big West Conference due to the COVID-19 pandemic.

Professional
On January 21, 2021, Quezada was selected 68th overall in the 2021 MLS SuperDraft by Los Angeles FC. Quezada was officially signed by the MLS side on April 24, 2021. 

On May 5, 2021, Quezada was loaned to LAFC's USL Championship affiliate side Las Vegas Lights. Quezada made his professional debut the same day, starting in a 5–0 loss to LA Galaxy II. Quezada was released by Los Angeles following the 2021 season.

On February 4, 2022, Quezada signed with Las Vegas Lights ahead of their 2022 season.

References

External links

UC Irvine bio

1999 births
American soccer players
Association football defenders
Las Vegas Lights FC players
Living people
Los Angeles FC draft picks
Los Angeles FC players
People from Lancaster, California
Soccer players from California
UC Irvine Anteaters men's soccer players
USL Championship players